Building occupancy classifications refer to categorizing structures based on their usage and are primarily used for building and fire code enforcement.  They are usually defined by model building codes, and vary, somewhat, among them.  Often, many of them are subdivided.

Classifications by Group 
The following is based on the International Building Code, the most commonly used building code in the United States:

Assembly (Group A) - places used for people gathering for entertainment, worship, and eating or drinking.  Examples:  churches, restaurants (with 50 or more possible occupants), theaters, and stadiums. Group A is divided into five sub groups:
A-1 Buildings intended for the production and viewing of performing arts or motion pictures (theaters, concert halls).
A-2 Buildings intended for food and/or drink consumption (restaurants). 
A-3 Buildings intended for worship, recreation or amusement and other assembly uses not otherwise classified.
A-4 Buildings intended for viewing of indoor sporting events and activities with spectator seating (arenas). 
A-5 Buildings intended for participation in or viewing outdoor activities (stadiums).

Business (Group B) - places where services are provided (not to be confused with mercantile, below).  Examples: banks, insurance agencies, government buildings (including police and fire stations), and doctor's offices.
Educational (Group E) - schools and day care centers up to the 12th grade.
Factory (Group F) - places where goods are manufactured or repaired (unless considered "High-Hazard" (below)).  Examples:  factories and dry cleaners.
High-Hazard (Group H) - places involving production or storage of very flammable or toxic materials.  Includes places handling explosives and/or highly toxic materials (such as fireworks, hydrogen peroxide, and cyanide).
Institutional (Group I) - places where people are physically unable to leave without assistance.  Examples:  hospitals, nursing homes, and prisons.  In some jurisdictions, Group I may be used to designate Industrial.
Mercantile (Group M) - places where goods are displayed and sold.  Examples:  grocery stores, department stores, and gas stations.
Residential (Group R) - places providing accommodations for overnight stay (excluding Institutional).  Examples:  houses, apartment buildings, hotels, and motels.
Storage (Group S) - places where items are stored (unless considered High-Hazard).  Examples:  warehouses and parking garages.
Utility and Miscellaneous (Group U) - others.  Examples:  water towers, barns, towers.

Other Considerations

Many buildings may have multiple occupancies.  These are referred to as "mixed occupancies" and the different parts will be required to meet the codes for those specific areas.  An example of this is a shopping mall with underground parking.  The shopping area itself is Group M (mercantile), while the parking area would qualify as Group S (storage).

In places where more than one occupancy may apply, the stricter code is usually enforced.  An example of this is a restaurant with seating under 50 which is not addressed in the code as either mercantile or business (this is a technical issue, but could be viewed as either or neither).  Code enforcement officials will usually enforce the stricter side of the code.

References

Safety codes